The Air Corps is the air component of the Defence Forces of Ireland. Through a fleet of fixed and rotary wing aircraft, it provides military support to the Army and Naval Service, together with non-military air services such as Garda air support, air ambulance, fisheries protection and the Ministerial Air Transport Service. Its headquarters and airfield is Casement Aerodrome located at Baldonnel, County Dublin. Unlike the Irish Army and Irish Naval Service, the Irish Air Corps does not maintain a reserve component and thus consists entirely of active service personnel.

History

National Army Air Service 

The National Army Air Service was independent Ireland's first air force. During the Anglo-Irish Treaty talks of 1921, a Martinsyde Type A Mark II biplane was purchased and put on 24-hour standby at Croydon Airport to allow Michael Collins to escape back to Ireland if the talks failed. The plane was not needed for this mission, and it became the first aircraft of the new National Army Air Service arriving in June 1922. The National Army Air Service was established in July 1922 and was gradually equipped with various aircraft types acquired from the R.A.F. and the Aircraft Disposal Company. This company had been formed in 1919 to dispose of surplus aircraft and aero-engines from World War I for the British Government. By the end of 1922, the National Army Air Service comprised ten aircraft, consisting of six Bristol F2B fighters from the First World War and four Martinsyde F4 Fighters, and about 400 men. Its successor, the Irish Army Air Corps was established in 1924 following a re-organisation of the National Army at the end of the Civil War.

The Air Corps

Early years

With the establishment of the Defence Forces in 1924, the Air Service became the new Army's Air Corps and remained part of the Army until the 1990s.

In 1938 four Gloster Gladiator biplane fighters were delivered – a further eight were ordered but were embargoed by the outbreak of the Second World War. Other aircraft purchased from the United Kingdom before the outbreak of war included 16 Avro Anson Mark I maritime patrol bombers, 3 Supermarine Walrus amphibians, 6 Westland Lysander Mark II army co-operation aircraft and a number of trainers.

World War II (The Emergency)
During World War II (or The Emergency) there are no records of Air Corps planes engaging any belligerent aircraft, although dozens of escaped barrage balloons were shot down. Requests for more aircraft from Britain resulted in 13 obsolete Hawker Hector biplane light bombers being supplied during 1941. Twelve Hawker Hurricane Mk. Is were initially ordered for the Irish Army Air Corps in 1940 but were not delivered due to a wartime embargo imposed by the British Government. Eleven Hurricane Mk. Is were eventually delivered to the Air Corps, from surplus R.A.F. stocks, between July 1943 and March 1944, and the Hurricane Mk. I (no.93), that crash-landed in Co. Wexford in 1940, was the twelfth aircraft. These were supplemented by 6 Hawker Hurricane Mk. IIcs that were delivered to the Irish Army Air Corps in March 1945, to eventually replace the Hurricane Mk. Is of No. 1 Fighter Squadron. Supplied from surplus R.A.F. stocks, the Hurricane Mk. IIcs were the last batch of aircraft to be delivered to the Air Corps before the end of World War II. The Hurricanes were the first monoplane fighter aircraft to enter service with the Air Corps and were also the first aircraft capable of reaching 300 m.p.h. in level flight. The Hurricane gave the Air Corps a proven modern fighter, and – at peak – 20 flew in Irish colours.
163 belligerent aircraft force-landed in Ireland during the war, and in this way, the Air Corps acquired a Lockheed Hudson, a Fairey Battle, and three Hawker Hurricanes.

Post-war
After the war, the Hurricanes were replaced by Supermarine Seafires and a few two-seat Spitfire trainers. Avro Anson light transports were operated as communications aircraft between 1946 and retirement in 1962. The Percival Provost was introduced in the mid-1950s as the Air Corps initial training aircraft.

The de Havilland Dove became the Corps' transport aircraft. The jet age arrived on 30 June 1956 when the Corps took delivery of de Havilland Vampire T.55 trainers. In November 1963 the Air Corps took delivery of its first helicopters, SA.316B Alouette IIIs, of which seven remained in service until 2007. During their operational lifetime, 3,300 people were assisted by the Alouette helicopters in their Search and Rescue and air ambulance roles.

During the mid-sixties and early seventies, the Corps played a part in expanding Ireland's film industry. Pilots and engineering staff participated in a 1965 box office success, The Blue Max. The fleet of World War I replicas, owned by ex-RCAF fighter pilot Lynn Garrison's "Blue Max Aviation", was based at Casement Aerodrome in Baldonnel – before being moved to Weston Aerodrome at Leixlip. Here the Corps continued its involvement, providing aircrew and engineering staff to support films such as Darling Lili, Von Richthofen and Brown, Zeppelin and a number of television commercials. Lynn Garrison was also responsible for coordinating the first demonstration of the Marchetti SF-260 Warrior at Baldonnel. As a result of this presentation, the Corps acquired a number of Warriors.

Expansion
In the mid-1970s the expansion of the "Ministerial Air Transport Service" (MATS) following Ireland's accession to the European Economic Community (now the European Union) led to the acquisition of the Corps' first business jet, a BAe 125-700.

In 1975 several Fouga Magister CM-170 jet aircraft were purchased secondhand from France. They were used for training, for the Light Strike Squadron and for the Silver Swallows display team. They were withdrawn from service in 1998 and not replaced, leaving the Irish Air Corps without any jet combat aircraft.

In 1977 ten SIAI-Marchetti SF.260WE Warriors were delivered for light training and ground attack roles. Four were lost in crashes. In 1986 five SA 365Fi Dauphin II were acquired for the SAR role. Two of these were modified for operation from the Naval Service Helicopter Patrol vessel LÉ Eithne, and equipped with crashproof fuel tanks and harpoon deck arrester gear.

As part of Ireland's obligations to the European Union, the Irish Air Corps patrols 132,000 square miles (342,000 km²) of the sea. The Air Corps previously employed two of its three Beechcraft 200 Super King Airs for this duty. However, the Super King Airs used for Maritime patrol were disposed of in the 1990s, and the third was allocated to transport duties. 102 Squadron operated one Beech King Air (#BB-672 with tail-number 240), but (as of 2010) it is out of service and hangared. Two previously operated aircraft (#BB-376 and #BB-208, with tail-numbers 232 and 234) were sold in 1991 and 1992 respectively.
 Two CASA C235-100 maritime patrol aircraft now undertake these patrols – and were upgraded in 2006/2007 by EADS CASA to the FITS Persuader standard with enhanced radar, forward looking infrared equipment and a new electronic and avionics suite.

In its MATS role, following Ireland's assumption of the EU Presidency the Corps leased a Grumman Gulfstream III – which in 1990 became the first Irish military aircraft to circumnavigate the world. A Grumman Gulfstream IV was later acquired, as was a Learjet 45. The average cost per hour in 2012 of operating the Gulfstream IV was €3,790.

In 2004 eight Pilatus PC-9M trainers were delivered to the Air Corps. The Pilatus aircraft were the first Air Corps aircraft to break with an Air Corps tradition of using consecutive tail-numbers. The General Officer Commanding started the new Pilatus tail-numbers in the 260 series – jumping from tail-number 258 (a Learjet 45) to 260 (the first Pilatus) – skipping tail-number 259. The Pilatus is the first Air Corps aircraft to have ejection seats since the Vampire. The PC-9M has six underwing hardpoints and has the capability to be armed with FN HMP250 gun pods, each carrying one M3P machine gun, and FN LAU-7 rocket pods, each carrying seven Folding-Fin Aerial Rockets, for the close air support role. Aircrews have an annual live firing exercise, flying out of Casement Aerodrome at Baldonnel to the coastal range at Gormanston Camp.

Two Eurocopter EC135P2 light utility helicopters were delivered to the Air Corps in November 2005. The first of four AgustaWestland AW139s were handed over to the Air Corps at Agusta's facility in Milan in November 2006. Two of the AW139 remained in Milan to provide training for Irish pilots before being flown to Ireland in December 2006. These helicopters are another first for the Air Corps as they are delivered with the capability to carry cabin mounted 7.62mm General Purpose Machine Guns.

On 12 October 2009 an Air Corps instructor, Captain Derek Furniss, and Cadet David Jevens were killed when their Pilatus PC-9 crashed during a training exercise in Connemara, County Galway.

During the 2011 Libyan civil war, the Air Corps was tasked with evacuating approximately forty Irish citizens from the troubled country. The operation involved two Air Corps aircraft (the Learjet and one CN-235), and nine personnel, using Malta as a temporary base.

2022 Commission on the Defence Forces

In February 2022, the Commission on the Defence Forces published a report. For the Air Corps, the report recommended that the service be renamed to the Irish Air Force and advocated for the establishment of a Chief of the Air Force. The report also recommended three levels of ambition (LOAs) with each level having different recommendations. LOA 1 proposes to maintain the current size of the Air Corps, while bringing active personnel numbers back up to the current establishment.

LOA 2 recommends the development of additional capabilities, including:

 2 additional medium helicopters - 8 Medium Helicopters to eventually be replaced with 8 super-medium helicopters
 Primary radar - establish a Recognised Air Picture (RAP)
 Strategic reach aircraft - transport and airlift for overseas deployments
 Counter UAV - Anti-drone/UAV capability
 Air Corps Reserve - recruitment of specialist roles (technicians, trained pilots, air traffic controllers)

LOA 3 recommends a further development of Air Corps combat capabilities, including:

 Jet combat aircraft - Air combat/intercept capability
 Troop carrier aircraft - Overseas deployment of personnel
 Armed CSAR helicopters - Organic intra-theatre deployments

Under LOA 3, the new Air Force would also be capable of deploying combat pilots, aircraft and support personnel overseas. LOA 2 recommends a budget of €1.5 billion with LOA 3 recommending a budget of €3 billion. The commission compared Ireland to other nations of similar GDP and population size, and determined these budgetary increases would be commensurate with those nations.

Organisation 
The Irish Air Corps is the air branch of the Irish Defence Forces. Headed up by Brigadier General Rory O'Connor, General Officer Commanding, Air Corps (GOCAC), the Air Corps comprises a staff headquarters, two air wings, two ground support wings, one independent squadron and the Air Corps College. The Air Corps' principal base of operations is out of Casement Aerodrome in Dublin.

Air Corps Headquarters 
 Office of General Officer Commanding
 Operations Section
 Support Section
 Military Airworthiness Authority
 Flight Safety Section
 Military Police Section

No 1 Operations Wing
1 Operations Wing is the main formation responsible for operational fixed-wing flying. This is sub-divided into four individual flying squadrons and two non-flying squadrons, each of which has a dedicated role:
 101 Squadron – Maritime Surveillance and Airlift 
 102 Squadron – Ministerial Transport
 103 Squadron – Engineering
 104 Squadron – Army Co-op 
 105 Squadron – Defence Forces Photographic Section

No 3 Operations Wing
3 Operations Wing is the formation responsible for operational rotary wing flying, and is divided into three flying squadrons and one non-flying squadron. It provides pilots for the Emergency Aeromedical Service, the air ambulance service which is jointly operated by the Air Corps and the HSE National Ambulance Service.
 301 Tactical Helicopter Squadron
 302 Training and Surveillance Squadron
 303 Maintenance and Deployment Squadron
 304 Garda Air Support Squadron

No 4 Support Wing
4 Support Wing is primarily concerned with second-line aircraft maintenance (front line maintenance is done by the engineering squadrons in each operational wing). This formation has two squadrons.
 401 Squadron – Mechanical support
 402 Squadron – Avionics support

No 5 Support Wing
5 Support Wing is responsible for logistic support for the Air Corps.
 502 Squadron – Logistic support
 503 Squadron – Transport
 504 Squadron – Medical services
 505 Squadron – Air Traffic Control
 506 Squadron – Fire Fighting

Communication & Information Services Squadron
Communication & Information Services Squadron (CIS) is responsible for the supply and maintenance of ground-based communications, navigation, radar and IT systems for the Air Corps. The CIS Squadron comprises a headquarters and four flights.

 Squadron HQ
 Airfield Services Flight
 Communications Flight
 Technical Services Flight
 Information Technology Flight

Air Corps College

The Air Corps College is the principal training unit of the Irish Air Corps, where all entrants into the service undertake their training. The College is divided into three distinct schools:
 Flying Training School (FTS) – The FTS has primary responsibility both for flying training, for which it is equipped with a squadron of Pilatus PC-9 fixed-wing aircraft, as well as officer training.
 Technical Training School (TTS) – The TTS undertakes technical training for those who will become aircraft technicians.
 Military Training and Survival School (MTSS) – The MTSS is responsible for the basic military training of all new recruits, as well as career progression training.

Aircraft

Current inventory

Aircraft retirements 
Replaced by the PC-9Ms, several SF-260WE Marchetti Warriors (the previous fixed-wing mainstay of the Air Corps College) were sold to a private reseller in the United States – with one example retained for the Air Corps museum collection. Several other aircraft (including four Dauphins and one Gazelle) have retired from service, struck off the Air Corps aircraft register and sold to foreign buyers.

The Sikorsky S-61N operated by the Air Corps for Search and Rescue operations was returned to CHC Helicopter. As part of this consolidation to a number of supported types, and following the exercise of two further options on AW139 Utility Helicopters, the previous army support and SAR Alouette fleet, the Alouette IIIs, were "stood down" at a ceremony at Casement aerodrome on 21 September 2007. This aircraft and unit provided the first SAR helicopter service in Ireland and one of the first dedicated national air ambulance services in the world when founded in 1964.

The Eurocopter Twin Squirrel helicopter of the Garda Air Support Unit was replaced by a second Eurocopter EC135 in January 2008.

A Gulfstream IV operated by the Irish Air Corps on behalf of the Irish Ministerial Air Transport Service was removed from service after corrosion was detected in the undercarriage in July 2014. The government sold the jet in December 2014 for $500,000, and (as of March 2015) the government were considering whether to acquire a replacement. The 2022 Report of the Commission on the Defence Forces suggested that a replacement aircraft for the Gulfstream IV would be essential if LOA 2 or 3 were to be met.

On 4 October 2019, after 47 years of service to the state, the 5 remaining (of 9 total) Reims Rocket FR172H (Cessna) aircraft were stood down from service after amassing 63,578 flight hours total. The Cessnas were replaced with several Pilatus PC-12 NG utility aircraft during 2020. The first of four Pilatus PC-12 aircraft was delivered in April 2020, with three further aircraft delivered in September 2020.

Weapons

Capabilities 

The Air Corps military roles and the functions it carries out are those of an army air corps rather than that of a conventional military air force. The Air Corps air space control and ground attack capacity is limited to low-level and limited weather. 
Helicopter tactical troop transport is available on a 24-hour basis through the introduction of Night Vision Goggles. The Air Corps non-military capabilities in aid to the civil power and other Government departments include ministerial transport, fishery protection, 24-hour maritime patrolling, Garda air support, search and rescue over both land and sea, an air ambulance service, aerial firefighting, drugs surveillance and non-combatant evacuation. The Air Corps provides the State with the capacity to meet security and contingent roles but only receives 12% of Defence Forces funding (see Dáil Defence Vote 2014).

Future 
In July 2015, the Irish government revealed plans to purchase a ground-based long-range air surveillance radar system for the Irish Aviation Authority (IAA) and Defence Forces to keep track of covert aircraft flying in Irish-controlled airspace, including military aircraft that do not file a flight plan and have their transponders switched off. Minister for Defence Simon Coveney said the increased capability would give better coverage of the Atlantic airspace over which the IAA has responsibility. The long-range surveillance radar is reported to cost €10 million and is seen as a priority purchase to provide the civilian and military authorities with an improved competency in monitoring aerial incursions. Ireland is not a member of NATO, and thus does not benefit from integrated European military radar systems or NATO equipment. The Irish Air Corps lacks a dedicated air intercept capability, and previous air incursions have seen the Royal Air Force respond to and escort unwelcome aircraft out of Irish controlled airspace.

The Pilatus PC9s are planned for replacement by 2025. The two CASA CN-235s are due to be replaced in 2023 by two Airbus C295 maritime patrol aircraft which will also be used for search and rescue, transport, special forces operations, MEDEVAC and other utility roles.

In June 2020, the Irish Times reported that a five-year investment strategy document, published by the Irish government, included the potential for "air combat interceptors". The speculated purchase of fighter/interceptor jets would represent a change from the use of British jets to intercept unknown airplanes encroaching Irish airspace. A submission to the commission on defence, looked at the Aermacchi M-346, the KAI FA-50 and the Saab Gripen as candidates for replacing the current PC-9 inventory, with a minimum of 8 aircraft recommended for peace-time air policing capability and 40 aircraft for "full" air defence.

In February 2022, the Commission on the Defence Forces report was published. It recommended that the Air Corps be renamed to the Air Force and made further recommendations under two Levels of Ambition (LOAs). Under LOA 2, the proposed new Air Force would establish a primary radar capability to develop a Recognised Air Picture, strategic airlift aircraft such as the C-130 and additional medium-lift helicopters. Under LOA 3, the Air Force would acquire between 12 to 24 air combat/interceptor aircraft, including the ability to deploy both pilots and support personnel overseas in contribution to international operations. Some favoured aircraft types include the Saab JAS 39 Gripen and Lockheed Martin F-16. This would transform Ireland's air defence capabilities to the level of comparable European nations of similar population and economic size, such as Denmark, Belgium, Austria and Norway. At the 2022 Slándáil Irish Defence and Security summit, Lockheed Martin made a number of proposals involving the possible sales of F-16 Block 70 or FA-50 light-fighter aircraft (should the Irish government select LOA 2 of the Commission on the Defence Forces report), or 12 new F-16 Block 70s (if LOA 3 was selected), or a proposal to acquire second-hand F-16s from European countries switching to the manufacturer's F-35 platform.

Roles

Air Ambulance 
The Air Corps provides an air ambulance service (for emergency rapid transfer of patients between hospitals, to hospitals from offshore islands and transferring patients for treatment overseas. The service also transports emergency organ retrieval teams. The aircraft used are the AW139, EC135, CASA and Learjet.

An Air Corps AW139 also provides an Emergency Aeromedical Service for the National Ambulance Service based out of Custume Barracks in Athlone, providing an emergency patient airlift service from scenes of accidents to hospitals.

Maritime Patrol 
The Air Corps operates two CASA CN235 Maritime Patrol aircraft in support of the fishery protection. These long-range aircraft patrol throughout the Irish exclusive fishery limits. These are intended to be replaced in time with more capable maritime patrol aircraft, as stated in the White Paper on Defence.

Ministerial Air Transport Service 
The Air Corps provide a Ministerial Air Transport Service (MATS) to assist the President and members of the Government in official engagements at both home and abroad. The Learjet 45 is used specifically for this purpose. The Gulfstream IV was previously used in this capacity.
The AW139 and occasionally the EC135 and CASA are also used for the MATS.

Garda Air Support 

The Garda Air Support Unit is a unit of the Garda Síochána that provides specialist air support for Ireland's national police force. The Air Corps, in conjunction with the Department of Justice and Equality, operates three aircraft for the Garda Air Support role: two Eurocopter EC135 T2 helicopters and a Britten-Norman Defender aircraft.

Operational control of the aircraft remains with the Department of Justice, Equality and Law Reform, whereas the Air Corps provide pilots and aircraft technicians to the Garda Air Support Unit that fly and maintain the aircraft.

Ranks 

The Air Corps' ranks are similar to those of the Irish Army. As of 2020, the strength was 752 all ranks.

See also 
Colonel James Fitzmaurice
Defence Forces (Ireland)
History of Ireland
Irish State Aircraft
List of aircraft of the Irish Air Corps
Permanent Defence Force Other Ranks Representative Association
Politics of the Republic of Ireland
Representative Association of Commissioned Officers
Reserve Defence Forces Representative Association

References

External links 

Air Corps section of the Irish Defence Forces website
Cockpit video of "Silver Swallows" in action

 
1924 establishments in Ireland